Hibbertia trichocalyx is a species of flowering plant in the family Dilleniaceae and is endemic to the south coast of Western Australia. It is an erect, spreading shrub with oblong to elliptic leaves and yellow flowers with eleven stamens arranged around three glabrous carpels.

Description
There are eleven stamens joined in three groups of three with two free from the others, around three glabrous carpels that each contain a single ovule. Flowering occurs from September to November.

Taxonomy
Hibbertia trichocalyx was first formally described in 2002 Judith R. Wheeler in the journal Nuytsia from specimens collected she collected in 1986 near Windy Harbour. The specific epithet (trichocalyx) means "hair-covering", referring to the hairy sepals.

Distribution and habitat
This hibbertia grows in heath and woodland on sand dunes, winter-wet places and sandy hills on the south coast of Western Australia in the Jarrah Forest and Warren biogeographic regions of Western Australia.

See also
List of Hibbertia species

References

trichocalyx
Flora of Western Australia
Plants described in 2002